Graphoderus austriacus is a species of beetle in family Dytiscidae.

Description
Body is broadly oval. There is a small transverse fascia on the pronotum.

Distribution
This species is present in Austria, Belarus, Belgium, Bosnia and Herzegovina, Bulgaria, Croatia, the Czech Republic, mainland Denmark, mainland France, Germany, Hungary, Italy, Kaliningrad, Latvia, Moldova, Poland, Russia (Central, East and South), Slovakia, Slovenia, Sweden, Switzerland, Ukraine, and Yugoslavia.

Bibliography
 Nilsson, Anders N. (2001), World Catalogue of Insects, volume 3: Dytiscidae (Coleoptera)
 ITIS: The Integrated Taxonomic Information System.

References

Dytiscidae
Beetles described in 1834